The women's 400 metre freestyle event at the 2020 Summer Olympics was held from 25 to 26 July 2021 at the Tokyo Aquatics Centre. It was the event's twenty-third consecutive appearance, having been held at every edition since 1924.

Summary 
In one of the most anticipated races at these Games, Australia's Ariarne Titmus came from behind to hand the U.S.' defending Olympic champion Katie Ledecky her first-ever individual Olympic loss and become the first Australian to win the event since Shane Gould in 1972. Trailing Ledecky by nearly a body length at the halfway mark, Titmus launched a blistering final hundred to win the gold in 3:56.69, registering the second fastest time in history. While Ledecky took the early lead, she was unable to overtake Titmus in the final lap, settling for the silver in 3:57.36.

Meanwhile, China's Li Bingjie reset her Asian Record for the second time in as many days to take the bronze nearly four seconds back in 4:01.08. Whilst Canada's Summer McIntosh was third at the final turn, she faded down the stretch to finish fourth in a Canadian Record of 4:02.42. China's Tang Muhan (4:04.10), Germany's Isabel Gose (4:04.98), the U.S. Paige Madden (4:06.81) and New Zealand's Erika Fairweather (4:08:81) rounded out the championship field, with all four swimmers slower than their preliminary times.

The medals for competition were presented by John Coates, IOC Vice-President, and the gifts were presented by Penny Heyns, FINA Bureau Member.

Records
Prior to this competition, the existing world and Olympic records were as follows.

No new records were set during the competition.

Qualification

 
The Olympic Qualifying Time for the event was 4:07.90. Up to two swimmers per National Olympic Committee (NOC) could automatically qualify by swimming that time at an approved qualification event. The Olympic Selection Time was 4:15.34. Up to one swimmer per NOC meeting that time was eligible for selection, allocated by world ranking until the maximum quota for all swimming events was reached. NOCs without a female swimmer qualified in any event could also use their universality place.

Competition format

The competition consisted of two rounds: heats and a final. The swimmers with the best 8 times in the heats advanced to the final. Swim-offs were to be used as necessary to break ties for advancement to the next round.

Schedule
All times are Japan standard time (UTC+9)

Results

Heats
The swimmers with the top 8 times, regardless of heat, advanced to the final.

Final

References

Women's 00400 metre freestyle
Olympics
Women's events at the 2020 Summer Olympics
2021 in women's swimming